Blind Spot is a 2017 Belgian thriller film directed by Nabil Ben Yadir. It stars Peter Van Den Begin as Jan Vorbeek, an uncompromising police officer from Antwerp. The film was written by Laurent Brandenbourger and Ben Yadir, who also produced alongside Peter Bouckaert and Benoit Roland.

It was screened at the Beaune International Film Festival on 30 March 2017, where it competed for the Grand Prix. At the 8th Magritte Awards, Blind Spot received four nominations, including Best Film and Best Director for Ben Yadir, winning Most Promising Actor for Chilah.

Cast
 Peter Van Den Begin as Jan Vorbeek
 Soufiane Chilah as Dries Ben Haïfa
 Jan Decleir as Voorzitter
 David Murgia as Axel

Critical reception
On review aggregator website AlloCiné, the film holds an average score of three stars out of five, based on a survey of 20 reviews.

Accolades

References

External links
 

2017 films
2017 thriller films
Belgian thriller films
2010s Dutch-language films
2010s French-language films
2017 multilingual films
Belgian multilingual films